Diffraction is defined as the interference or bending of waves around the corners of an obstacle or through an aperture into the region of geometrical shadow of the obstacle/aperture. The diffracting object or aperture effectively becomes a secondary source of the propagating wave. Italian scientist Francesco Maria Grimaldi coined the word diffraction and was the first to record accurate observations of the phenomenon in 1660.

In classical physics, the diffraction phenomenon is described by the Huygens–Fresnel principle that treats each point in a propagating wavefront as a collection of individual spherical wavelets. The characteristic bending pattern is most pronounced when a wave from a coherent source (such as a laser) encounters a slit/aperture that is comparable in size to its wavelength, as shown in the inserted image. This is due to the addition, or interference, of different points on the wavefront (or, equivalently, each wavelet) that travel by paths of different lengths to the registering surface. If there are multiple, closely spaced openings (e.g., a diffraction grating), a complex pattern of varying intensity can result.

These effects also occur when a light wave travels through a medium with a varying refractive index, or when a sound wave travels through a medium with varying acoustic impedance – all waves diffract, including gravitational waves, water waves, and other electromagnetic waves such as X-rays and radio waves. Furthermore, quantum mechanics also demonstrates that matter possesses wave-like properties, and hence, undergoes diffraction (which is measurable at subatomic to molecular levels).

The amount of diffraction depends on the size of the gap. Diffraction is greatest when the size of the gap is similar to the wavelength of the wave. In this case, when the waves pass through the gap they become semi-circular.

History

The effects of diffraction of light were first carefully observed and characterized by Francesco Maria Grimaldi, who also coined the term diffraction, from the Latin diffringere, 'to break into pieces', referring to light breaking up into different directions. The results of Grimaldi's observations were published posthumously in 1665. Isaac Newton studied these effects and attributed them to inflexion of light rays. James Gregory (1638–1675) observed the diffraction patterns caused by a bird feather, which was effectively the first diffraction grating to be discovered. Thomas Young performed a celebrated experiment in 1803 demonstrating interference from two closely spaced slits. Explaining his results by interference of the waves emanating from the two different slits, he deduced that light must propagate as waves. Augustin-Jean Fresnel did more definitive studies and calculations of diffraction, made public in 1816 and 1818, and thereby gave great support to the wave theory of light that had been advanced by Christiaan Huygens and reinvigorated by Young, against Newton's particle theory.

Mechanism

In classical physics diffraction arises because of the way in which waves propagate; this is described by the Huygens–Fresnel principle and the principle of superposition of waves. The propagation of a wave can be visualized by considering every particle of the transmitted medium on a wavefront as a point source for a secondary spherical wave. The wave displacement at any subsequent point is the sum of these secondary waves. When waves are added together, their sum is determined by the relative phases as well as the amplitudes of the individual waves so that the summed amplitude of the waves can have any value between zero and the sum of the individual amplitudes.  Hence, diffraction patterns usually have a series of maxima and minima.

In the modern quantum mechanical understanding of light propagation through a slit (or slits) every photon has what is known as a wavefunction.  The wavefunction is determined by the physical surroundings such as slit geometry, screen distance and initial conditions when the photon is created.  In important experiments (A low-intensity double-slit experiment was first performed by G. I. Taylor in 1909, see double-slit experiment) the existence of the photon's wavefunction was demonstrated.  In the quantum approach the diffraction pattern is created by the probability distribution, the observation of light and dark bands is the presence or absence of photons in these areas, where these particles were more or less likely to be detected.  The quantum approach has some striking similarities to the Huygens-Fresnel principle; based on that principle, as light travels through slits and boundaries, secondary, point light sources are created near or along these obstacles, and the resulting diffraction pattern is going to be the intensity profile based on the collective interference of all these lights sources that have different optical paths. That is similar to considering the limited regions around the slits and boundaries where photons are more likely to originate from, in the quantum formalism, and calculating the probability distribution. This distribution is directly proportional to the intensity, in the classical formalism.

There are various analytical models which allow the diffracted field to be calculated, including the Kirchhoff-Fresnel diffraction equation which is derived from the wave equation, the Fraunhofer diffraction approximation of the Kirchhoff equation which applies to the far field, the Fresnel diffraction approximation  which applies to the near field and the Feynman path integral formulation.  Most configurations cannot be solved analytically, but can yield numerical solutions through finite element and boundary element methods.

It is possible to obtain a qualitative understanding of many diffraction phenomena by considering how the relative phases of the individual secondary wave sources vary, and in particular, the conditions in which the phase difference equals half a cycle in which case waves will cancel one another out.

The simplest descriptions of diffraction are those in which the situation can be reduced to a two-dimensional problem. For water waves, this is already the case; water waves propagate only on the surface of the water. For light, we can often neglect one direction if the diffracting object extends in that direction over a distance far greater than the wavelength. In the case of light shining through small circular holes we will have to take into account the full three-dimensional nature of the problem.

Examples

The effects of diffraction are often seen in everyday life. The most striking examples of diffraction are those that involve light; for example, the closely spaced tracks on a CD or DVD act as a diffraction grating to form the familiar rainbow pattern seen when looking at a disc. This principle can be extended to engineer a grating with a structure such that it will produce any diffraction pattern desired; the hologram on a credit card is an example. Diffraction in the atmosphere by small particles can cause a bright ring to be visible around a bright light source  like the sun or the moon. A shadow of a solid object, using light from a compact source, shows small fringes near its edges. The speckle pattern which is observed when laser light falls on an optically rough surface is also a diffraction phenomenon.  When deli meat appears to be iridescent, that is diffraction off the meat fibers. All these effects are a consequence of the fact that light propagates as a wave.

Diffraction can occur with any kind of wave. Ocean waves diffract around jetties and other obstacles. Sound waves can diffract around objects, which is why one can still hear someone calling even when hiding behind a tree.
Diffraction can also be a concern in some technical applications; it sets a fundamental limit to the resolution of a camera, telescope, or microscope.

Other examples of diffraction are considered below.

Single-slit diffraction

 

A long slit of infinitesimal width which is illuminated by light diffracts the light into a series of circular waves and the wavefront which emerges from the slit is a cylindrical wave of uniform intensity, in accordance with Huygens–Fresnel principle.

An illuminated slit that is wider than a wavelength produces interference effects in the space downstream of the slit. Assuming that the slit behaves as though it has a large number of point sources spaced evenly across the width of the slit interference effects can be calculated. The analysis of this system is simplified if we consider light of a single wavelength. If the incident light is coherent, these sources all have the same phase. Such phase differences are caused by differences in the path lengths over which contributing rays reach the point from the slit.

We can find the angle at which a first minimum is obtained in the diffracted light by the following reasoning. The light from a source located at the top edge of the slit interferes destructively with a source located at the middle of the slit, when the path difference between them is equal to λ/2. Similarly, the source just below the top of the slit will interfere destructively with the source located just below the middle of the slit at the same angle. We can continue this reasoning along the entire height of the slit to conclude that the condition for destructive interference for the entire slit is the same as the condition for destructive interference between two narrow slits a distance apart that is half the width of the slit. The path difference is approximately  so that the minimum intensity occurs at an angle  given by

where
  is the width of the slit,
  is the angle of incidence at which the minimum intensity occurs, and
  is the wavelength of the light

A similar argument can be used to show that if we imagine the slit to be divided into four, six, eight parts, etc., minima are obtained at angles  given by

where
  is an integer other than zero.

There is no such simple argument to enable us to find the maxima of the diffraction pattern. The intensity profile can be calculated using the Fraunhofer diffraction equation as

where
  is the intensity at a given angle,
 is the unnormalized sinc function.

This analysis applies only to the far field (Fraunhofer diffraction), that is, at a distance much larger than the width of the slit.

When the incident angle  of the light onto the slit is non-zero (which causes a change in the path length), the intensity profile in the Fraunhofer regime (i.e. far field) becomes:

The choice of plus/minus sign depends on the definition of the incident angle .

Diffraction grating

A diffraction grating is an optical component with a regular pattern. The form of the light diffracted by a grating depends on the structure of the elements and the number of elements present, but all gratings have intensity maxima at angles θm which are given by the grating equation

where
  is the angle at which the light is incident,
  is the separation of grating elements, and
  is an integer which can be positive or negative.

The light diffracted by a grating is found by summing the light diffracted from each of the elements, and is essentially a convolution of diffraction and interference patterns.

The figure shows the light diffracted by 2-element and 5-element gratings where the grating spacings are the same; it can be seen that the maxima are in the same position, but the detailed structures of the intensities are different.

Circular aperture

The far-field diffraction of a plane wave incident on a circular aperture is often referred to as the Airy Disk.  The variation in intensity with angle is given by

,

where a is the radius of the circular aperture, k is equal to 2π/λ and J1 is a Bessel function.  The smaller the aperture, the larger the spot size at a given distance, and the greater the divergence of the diffracted beams.

General aperture
The wave that emerges from a point source has amplitude  at location r that is given by the solution of the frequency domain wave equation for a point source (the Helmholtz equation),

where  is the 3-dimensional delta function.  The delta function has only radial dependence, so the Laplace operator (a.k.a. scalar Laplacian) in the spherical coordinate system simplifies to (see del in cylindrical and spherical coordinates)

By direct substitution, the solution to this equation can be readily shown to be the scalar Green's function, which in the spherical coordinate system (and using the physics time convention ) is:

This solution assumes that the delta function source is located at the origin.  If the source is located at an arbitrary source point, denoted by the vector  and the field point is located at the point , then we may represent the scalar Green's function (for arbitrary source location) as:

Therefore, if an electric field, Einc(x,y) is incident on the aperture, the field produced by this aperture distribution is given by the surface integral:

where the source point in the aperture is given by the vector

In the far field, wherein the parallel rays approximation can be employed, the Green's function,

simplifies to

as can be seen in the figure to the right (click to enlarge).

The expression for the far-zone (Fraunhofer region) field becomes

Now, since

and

the expression for the Fraunhofer region field from a planar aperture now becomes,

Letting,

and

the Fraunhofer region field of the planar aperture assumes the form of a Fourier transform

In the far-field / Fraunhofer region, this becomes the spatial Fourier transform of the aperture distribution.  Huygens' principle when applied to an aperture simply says that the far-field diffraction pattern is the spatial Fourier transform of the aperture shape, and this is a direct by-product of using the parallel-rays approximation, which is identical to doing a plane wave decomposition of the aperture plane fields (see Fourier optics).

Propagation of a laser beam
The way in which the beam profile of a laser beam changes as it propagates is determined by diffraction. When the entire emitted beam has a planar, spatially coherent wave front, it approximates Gaussian beam profile and has the lowest divergence for a given diameter. The smaller the output beam, the quicker it diverges. It is possible to reduce the divergence of a laser beam by first expanding it with one convex lens, and then collimating it with a second convex lens whose focal point is coincident with that of the first lens. The resulting beam has a larger diameter, and hence a lower divergence. Divergence of a laser beam may be reduced below the diffraction of a Gaussian beam or even reversed to convergence if the refractive index of the propagation media increases with the light intensity. This may result in a self-focusing effect.

When the wave front of the emitted beam has perturbations, only the transverse coherence length (where the wave front perturbation is less than 1/4 of the wavelength) should be considered as a Gaussian beam diameter when determining the divergence of the laser beam. If the transverse coherence length in the vertical direction is higher than in horizontal, the laser beam divergence will be lower in the vertical direction than in the horizontal.

Diffraction-limited imaging

The ability of an imaging system to resolve detail is ultimately limited by diffraction.  This is because a plane wave incident on a circular lens or mirror is diffracted as described above. The light is not focused to a point but forms an Airy disk having a central spot in the focal plane whose radius (as measured to the first null) is

where λ is the wavelength of the light and N is the f-number (focal length f divided by aperture diameter D) of the imaging optics; this is strictly accurate for N≫1 (paraxial case).  In object space, the corresponding angular resolution is

where D is the diameter of the entrance pupil of the imaging lens (e.g., of a telescope's main mirror).

Two point sources will each produce an Airy pattern – see the photo of a binary star.  As the point sources move closer together, the patterns will start to overlap, and ultimately they will merge to form a single pattern, in which case the two point sources cannot be resolved in the image.  The Rayleigh criterion specifies that two point sources are considered "resolved" if the separation of the two images is at least the radius of the Airy disk, i.e. if the first minimum of one coincides with the maximum of the other.

Thus, the larger the aperture of the lens compared to the wavelength, the finer the resolution of an imaging system. This is one reason astronomical telescopes require large objectives, and why microscope objectives require a large numerical aperture (large aperture diameter compared to working distance) in order to obtain the highest possible resolution.

Speckle patterns

The speckle pattern seen when using a laser pointer is another diffraction phenomenon. It is a result of the superposition of many waves with different phases, which are produced when a laser beam illuminates a rough surface. They add together to give a resultant wave whose amplitude, and therefore intensity, varies randomly.

Babinet's principle

Babinet's principle is a useful theorem stating that the diffraction pattern from an opaque body is identical to that from a hole of the same size and shape, but with differing intensities. This means that the interference conditions of a single obstruction would be the same as that of a single slit.

"Knife edge"
The knife-edge effect or knife-edge diffraction is a truncation of a portion of the incident radiation that strikes a sharp well-defined obstacle, such as a mountain range or the wall of a building.
The knife-edge effect is explained by Huygens–Fresnel principle, which states that a well-defined obstruction to an electromagnetic wave acts as a secondary source, and creates a new wavefront. This new wavefront propagates into the geometric shadow area of the obstacle.

Knife-edge diffraction is an outgrowth of the "half-plane problem", originally solved by Arnold Sommerfeld using a plane wave spectrum formulation.  A generalization of the half-plane problem is the "wedge problem", solvable as a boundary value problem in cylindrical coordinates. The solution in cylindrical coordinates was then extended to the optical regime by Joseph B. Keller, who introduced the notion of diffraction coefficients through his geometrical theory of diffraction (GTD).  Pathak and Kouyoumjian extended the (singular) Keller coefficients via the uniform theory of diffraction (UTD).

Patterns

Several qualitative observations can be made of diffraction in general:
 The angular spacing of the features in the diffraction pattern is inversely proportional to the dimensions of the object causing the diffraction. In other words: The smaller the diffracting object, the 'wider' the resulting diffraction pattern, and vice versa. (More precisely, this is true of the sines of the angles.)
 The diffraction angles are invariant under scaling; that is, they depend only on the ratio of the wavelength to the size of the diffracting object.
 When the diffracting object has a periodic structure, for example in a diffraction grating, the features generally become sharper. The third figure, for example, shows a comparison of a double-slit pattern with a pattern formed by five slits, both sets of slits having the same spacing, between the center of one slit and the next.

Particle diffraction

According to quantum theory every particle exhibits wave properties. In particular, massive particles can interfere with themselves and therefore diffract. Diffraction of electrons and neutrons stood as one of the powerful arguments in favor of quantum mechanics. The wavelength associated with a particle is the de Broglie wavelength

where h is Planck's constant and p is the momentum of the particle (mass × velocity for slow-moving particles).

For most macroscopic objects, this wavelength is so short that it is not meaningful to assign a wavelength to them.  A sodium atom traveling at about 30,000 m/s would have a De Broglie wavelength of about 50 pico meters.

Because the wavelength for even the smallest of macroscopic objects is extremely small, diffraction of matter waves is only visible for small particles, like electrons, neutrons, atoms and small molecules. The short wavelength of these matter waves makes them ideally suited to study the atomic crystal structure of solids and large molecules like proteins.

Relatively larger molecules like buckyballs were also shown to diffract.

Bragg diffraction

Diffraction from a three-dimensional periodic structure such as atoms in a crystal is called Bragg diffraction.
It is similar to what occurs when waves are scattered from a diffraction grating. Bragg diffraction is a consequence of interference between waves reflecting from different crystal planes.
The condition of constructive interference is given by Bragg's law:

where
λ is the wavelength,
d is the distance between crystal planes,
θ is the angle of the diffracted wave.
and m is an integer known as the order of the diffracted beam.

Bragg diffraction may be carried out using either electromagnetic radiation of very short wavelength like X-rays or matter waves like neutrons (and electrons) whose wavelength is on the order of (or much smaller than) the atomic spacing. The pattern produced gives information of the separations of crystallographic planes d, allowing one to deduce the crystal structure.  Diffraction contrast, in electron microscopes and x-topography devices in particular, is also a powerful tool for examining individual defects and local strain fields in crystals.

Coherence

The description of diffraction relies on the interference of waves emanating from the same source taking different paths to the same point on a screen. In this description, the difference in phase between waves that took different paths is only dependent on the effective path length. This does not take into account the fact that waves that arrive at the screen at the same time were emitted by the source at different times. The initial phase with which the source emits waves can change over time in an unpredictable way. This means that waves emitted by the source at times that are too far apart can no longer form a constant interference pattern since the relation between their phases is no longer time independent.

The length over which the phase in a beam of light is correlated, is called the coherence length. In order for interference to occur, the path length difference must be smaller than the coherence length. This is sometimes referred to as spectral coherence, as it is related to the presence of different frequency components in the wave. In the case of light emitted by an atomic transition, the coherence length is related to the lifetime of the excited state from which the atom made its transition.

If waves are emitted from an extended source, this can lead to incoherence in the transversal direction. When looking at a cross section of a beam of light, the length over which the phase is correlated is called the transverse coherence length. In the case of Young's double slit experiment, this would mean that if the transverse coherence length is smaller than the spacing between the two slits, the resulting pattern on a screen would look like two single slit diffraction patterns.

In the case of particles like electrons, neutrons, and atoms, the coherence length is related to the spatial extent of the wave function that describes the particle.

Applications

Diffraction before destruction 
A new way to image single biological particles has emerged since the 2010s, utilising the bright X-rays generated by X-ray free electron lasers. These femtosecond-duration pulses will allow for the (potential) imaging of single biological macromolecules. Due to these short pulses, radiation damage can be outrun, and diffraction patterns of single biological macromolecules will be able to be obtained.

See also

 Angle-sensitive pixel
 Atmospheric diffraction
 Brocken spectre
 Cloud iridescence
 Coherent diffraction imaging
 Diffraction from slits
 Diffraction spike
 Diffraction vs. interference
 Diffractive solar sail
 Diffractometer
 Dynamical theory of diffraction
 Fraunhofer diffraction
 Fresnel imager
 Fresnel number
 Fresnel zone
 Point spread function
 Powder diffraction
 Quasioptics
 Refraction
 Reflection
 Schaefer–Bergmann diffraction
 Thinned-array curse
 X-ray scattering techniques

References

External links

 The Feynman Lectures on Physics Vol. I Ch. 30: Diffraction
 

 
Physical phenomena